The Rural Municipality of Tisdale No. 427 is a rural municipality (RM) in the Canadian province of Saskatchewan within Census Division No. 14 and  Division No. 4. It is located in the northeast-central portion of the province.

History 
The RM of Eldersley No. 427 was originally incorporated as a rural municipality on December 9, 1912. Its name was changed to the RM of Tisdale No. 427 on January 15, 1921. Prior to incorporation in 1912, it was originally Local Improvement District 21-M-2.

Geography

Communities and localities 
The following urban municipalities are surrounded by the RM.

Towns
Tisdale

The following unincorporated communities are within the RM.

Organized hamlets
Sylvania

Localities
Eldersley

Demographics 

Government 
The RM of Tisdale No. 427 is governed by an elected municipal council and an appointed administrator that meets on the second Thursday of every month. The reeve of the RM is Ian Allan while its administrator is Dawn Marleau. The RM's office is located in Tisdale.

Transportation 
Rail
Tisdale Subdivision C.P.R - serves Barford, McKague, Sylvania, Golburn, Tisdale, Lurgan, Runciman, Leacross, Armley
Tisdale Subdivision C.N.R - serves Bannock, Mistatim, Peesane, Crooked River, Eldersley, Tisdale, Valparaiso, Star City, Melfort

Roads
Highway 3 serves Tisdale
Highway 35
Highway 680
Highway 776

See also 
List of rural municipalities in Saskatchewan

References 

Tisdale
Tisdale No. 427, Saskatchewan